Asociación Deportiva Lobón is a Spanish football team based in Lobón, Badajoz, in the autonomous community of Extremadura. Founded in 1997, it currently plays in Tercera División – Group 14, holding home matches at Estadio Municipal de Lobón, with a capacity of 1,500 spectators.

History
Founded in 1997, the club played occasionally in the Primera Regional while also spending some seasons without a senior team. In 2016, the club first reached the Primera División Extremeña, the top tier of regional football.

After winning the fifth tier in 2018–19, Lobón was qualified to the 2019–20 Copa del Rey, but lost in the preliminary round. In July 2020, the club achieved a first-ever promotion to Tercera División.

Season to season

1 season in Tercera División

References

External links
BDFutbol team profile
Soccerway team profile

1997 establishments in Spain
Association football clubs established in 1997
Football clubs in Extremadura
Province of Badajoz